Indianapolis Opera is an opera company based in Indianapolis, Indiana. It is the only professional opera company in Indiana and hosts a number of fully staged productions each season. It also supports a Young Artist Program. The company is led by General Director David Craig Starkey and Board President Michael Schultz.

History 

Since 1975, Indianapolis Opera has presented 109 operatic productions representing the work of 32 different composers, including 13 composers who wrote in the 20th century. Selected works range from standard classics to new or less-performed works, balancing musical style and language as well as comedy and tragedy.

The Frank and Katrina Basile Opera Center 
In 2008, Bill Oesterle, a local business entrepreneur, purchased the Holy Trinity Greek Orthodox Church building in the Meridian-Kessler neighborhood of Indianapolis and leased it to the Indianapolis Opera. The Indianapolis Opera went on to use the building for rehearsals, educational programs, and smaller performances. In 2015, the opera began producing performances at the Schrott Center for the Arts on the campus of Butler University.

Lobster Palooza 

Lobster Palooza is held annually as a fundraiser for the opera and educational outreach programs.

Annual Opera Ball 
The Annual Opera Ball contributes to the company's educational outreach programs.

References

External links
Official website
 

Performing arts in Indiana
Non-profit organizations based in Indianapolis
Tourist attractions in Indianapolis
American opera companies